Events from 1945 in England

Incumbent

Events

January

February

March

April

May
 8 May – V-E Day is celebrated throughout the UK. Prime Minister Winston Churchill makes a victory speech and appears on the balcony of Buckingham Palace with George VI, Queen Elizabeth and Princesses Elizabeth and Margaret. Street parties take place throughout the country.

June

July

August

September

October

November

December

Births

 26 July – Helen Mirren, actress
 30 November – Hilary Armstrong, politician
 17 December – Jacqueline Wilson, children's novelist
 Tom O'Carroll, paedophilia advocate

Deaths

See also
1945 in Northern Ireland
1945 in Scotland
1945 in Wales

References

 
England
Years of the 20th century in England
1940s in England